Dmytro Baranovskyi or Dmytro Baranovskyy (born July 28, 1979) is a male long-distance runner from Ukraine who specialises in the marathon. He represented his country in the event at the 2004 Summer Olympics.

Career
Baranovskyy won the 2005 edition of the annual Fukuoka Marathon, clocking 2:08:29 on December 4, 2005. He set his personal best of 2:07:15 at the competition the following year, but was beaten into the runner-up spot by Haile Gebrselassie. He was also the winner of the 10,000 metres gold medal at the 2001 European Athletics U23 Championships.

He returned to Fukuoka in 2011 and came seventh, the second European to finish after Dmitriy Safronov.

Achievements

References

External links
 
 

1979 births
Living people
Ukrainian male long-distance runners
Ukrainian male marathon runners
Athletes (track and field) at the 2004 Summer Olympics
Olympic athletes of Ukraine